{{Speciesbox
| status = NT
| status_system = IUCN3.1
| status_ref = 
| taxon = Acropora carduus
| authority = (Dana, 1846) <ref name=WoRMS>{{cite WoRMS |author =Hoeksema, Bert |year=2018 |title=Acropora carduus (Dana, 1846) |id=288189 |accessdate=12 June 2018 }}</ref>
}}Acropora carduus'' is a species of acroporid coral found in the northern Indian Ocean and the central Indo-Pacific.

References

Acropora
Corals described in 1846